The "Five Eyes" (FVEY) refers to an alliance comprising Australia, Canada, New Zealand, the United Kingdom and the United States. These countries are bound by the multilateral UKUSA Agreement for joint cooperation in signals intelligence. In recent years, documents of the FVEY have shown that they are intentionally spying on one another's citizens and sharing the collected information with each other in order to circumvent restrictive domestic regulations on spying.

As the surveillance capabilities of the FVEY continue to increase to keep up to pace with technological advancements, a global surveillance system has been gradually developed to capture the communications of entire populations across national borders. The following list contains a handful of targets of the FVEY who are public figures in various fields. In order for a person to be included in the list, there must be well-documented evidence based on reliable sources, such as leaked or declassified FVEY documents or whistleblower accounts, which demonstrate that the person involved is, or was, intentionally targeted for surveillance.

Since processed intelligence is gathered from multiple sources, the intelligence shared is not restricted to signals intelligence (SIGINT) and often involves defence intelligence as well as human intelligence (HUMINT) and geospatial intelligence (GEOINT).

Abbreviations of Anglospheric government agencies

List of surveilled persons

See also 
List of government surveillance projects
List of intelligence agencies

References 

Five Eyes surveillance
People under Five Eyes surveillance
People under Five Eyes surveillance
People under Five Eyes surveillance
Global surveillance
Espionage
Intelligence operations
National security